Cyngen Glodrydd was an early 6th-century King of Powys.  He was a descendant of King Cadell Ddyrnllwg. Cyngen married St. Tudlwystl, a daughter of Brychan ap Gwyngwen ap Tewdr (often confused with King Brychan Brycheiniog) and they were parents of a large family: Brochfael Ysgithrog, Cadell, Ieuaf, Maig Myngfras, Mawn and Sanan. What is probably his memorial stone was discovered being used as a gatepost in Tywyn (Gwynedd)      in 1761. He was apparently buried with St. Cadfan in the local churchyard.

References

Further reading
 Mike Ashley The Mammoth Book of British Kings & Queens London: Robinson, 1998 ; article 152: Cyngen Powys fl. 550s

Monarchs of Powys
House of Gwertherion
6th-century Welsh monarchs